The IUPUI Jaguars are the 18 intercollegiate teams that represent Indiana University–Purdue University Indianapolis, in Indianapolis, Indiana, U.S. They compete in the National Collegiate Athletic Association's Division I. On July 1, 2017, IUPUI left the Summit League to move to the Horizon League in all sports. The Jaguars were formerly known as the IUPUI Metros.

History
IUPUI first sponsored intercollegiate athletics in 1972, when the men's basketball team began play as the IUPUI Metros. Women's sports were first sponsored in 1975, when the women's basketball, softball, and volleyball teams first competed. In 1978, the Metros joined the NAIA. They joined NCAA Division II in 1993 and moved up to NCAA Division I in 1997. Also in 1997, IUPUI joined the Mid-Continent Conference (now known as the Summit League), and officially changed their nickname to the Jaguars. In 2000, the men's soccer team became the first Jaguar team to compete in an NCAA tournament.

On August 12, 2022, the boards of trustees of both the IU and Purdue systems announced that IUPUI will split into two separate universities, with completion of the split to be finished by the fall 2024 semester. Administration of the athletic program will fall to the new Indiana University Indianapolis.

Sports
A member of the Horizon League, IUPUI sponsors teams in eight men's and ten women's NCAA sanctioned sports:

IUPUI had a baseball team from 1979 until 2001.

Men's basketball 

The 1984–85 and 1989–90 men's basketball teams won the NAIA District 21 Tournament and advanced to the NAIA National Tournament. The 1989–90 Jaguars defeated Siena Heights in the NAIA Tournament, but lost their next game to Pfeiffer.

The 2002–03 Jaguars won the Mid-Continent Conference Tournament (now called the Summit League) and were the first men's basketball team to reach the NCAA tournament. They lost in the first round to Kentucky.

Former basketball coach Ron Hunter accepted the head coaching position at Georgia State University and was succeeded by Todd Howard.

Men's soccer
The men's soccer team advanced to the NAIA Division 21 Playoffs in 1988, 1989, 1990 and 1993. The 1993 team advanced to the NAIA Division 21 Championship before their season ended. The 1994 team lost in the NAIA Division 21 Tournament.

In 2000, the Jaguars won the Mid-Continent Conference Tournament. They defeated Marist in an NCAA tournament play-in game. Their season ended with a loss to SMU in their only NCAA tournament. That year, the Jaguars finished with an 11–9–2 record.

Women's basketball
The women's basketball team won the NAIA District 21 Tournament in 1989–1990 and 1990–1991. The 1990–1991 team advanced to the semifinals of the NAIA National Tournament before losing to Southwestern Oklahoma State.

The Jaguars clinched their first NCAA tournament berth by winning the 2020 Horizon League women's basketball tournament.

Women's softball
The women's softball team competes at the NAIA level from 1983 through 1991. The Lady Metros (now Jaguars) appeared in nine straight NAIA regional and national tournaments, finishing third place twice and fourth place twice during that time span. They were coached by P. Nicholas Kellum who is now a member of the IUPUI Athletic Hall of Fame and was the school's first athletic director and served as the dean of the School of Physical Education for many years.

Women's tennis
The 2002–2003 and 2003–2004 tennis teams won the Mid-Continent Conference Tournament. They then advanced to the NCAA Tournament where they lost in the first round.

Venues
Several Jaguars teams play in the IUPUI Gymnasium, popularly known as The Jungle. Since 2014 the men's basketball team has played at the Indiana Farmers Coliseum. The softball team plays at the IUPUI Softball Complex, and the tennis team plays at the West Indy Racquet Club. The swimming team competes at the Indiana University Natatorium, which has a capacity of 4,700. The soccer teams play at IU Michael A. Carroll Track & Soccer Stadium.

Hall of Fame
For an alphabetical list of inductees, see footnote
For a list of inductees by sport, see footnote
For a list of inductees by class year, see footnote
For a list of inductees by induction year, see footnote
The IUPUI Intercollegiate Athletics Hall of Fame was founded in 1993.

References

External links

 

 
1972 establishments in Indiana
Sports clubs established in 1972